The Waterstones Children's Book Prize is an annual award given to a work of children's literature published during the previous year. First awarded in 2005, the purpose of the prize is "to uncover hidden talent in children's writing" and is therefore open only to authors who have published no more than three books. The prize is awarded by British book retailer Waterstones.

Beginning in 2012, the prize was divided into three categories: Picture Books, Fiction 5–12, and Teen. Each category winner receives £2,000 with an overall winner chosen from the three getting an additional £3,000 (thus the overall winner receives £5,000 in total).

Recipients

References

External links

 Official Waterstones Children's Book Prize site – dedicated to the latest winners

British children's literary awards
Young adult literature awards
Picture book awards
Awards established in 2005
2005 establishments in the United Kingdom
English-language literary awards